This is a list of buildings that are examples of the Art Deco architectural style in Kansas, United States.

Abilene 
 203 North Buckeye, Abilene, 1930
 Abilene Swimming Pool, Abilene, 1937
 Garfield School, Abilene, 1942
 Hotel Sunflower, Abilene, 1925
 Sunflower Building, Abilene, 1931

Arkansas City 
 AC Office Building, Arkansas City, 1929
 First Intermark (former Newman's Department Store), Arkansas City, 1917
 Holt Motor Company (former Arkansas City Motor Company, R&K Motor Company), Arkansas City, 1911

El Dorado 
 101 Main Street, El Dorado, 1930
 El Dorado Middle School, El Dorado, 1930s
 USD 490 District Performing Arts Center, El Dorado, 1937

Emporia 
 520 North Commercial, Emporia, 1932
 624 North Commercial, Emporia, 1910
 701 North Commercial, Emporia, 1925

Hutchinson 
 Catalyst Lofts & Extended Stay, Hutchinson, 1927
 Fox Theater, Hutchinson, 1931
 Hutchinson Fire Station No. 1, Hutchinson, 1935
 Lyons Middle School, Hutchinson, 1930
 Reno County Courthouse, Hutchinson, 1930
 S. H. Kress and Co. Building, Hutchinson, 1933
 Strand Theatre, Hutchinson, 1913
 United States Post Office, Hutchinson, 1942

Kansas City 
 1327, Minnesota Avenue Kansas City, 1931 and 1945
 1401 Minnesota Avenue (former dairy), Kansas City, 1931 and 1945
 1830 Minnesota Avenue, Kansas City, 1931 and 1945
 AT&T Building, 948 North 10th Street, Kansas City, 1938
 Boulevard at the Med Center Apartments, Kansas City, 1938
 Kansas City Kansan Building, Kansas City, 1928
 Kansas State School for the Blind, Kansas City, 1937
 Kaw Valley State Bank, Kansas City
 Kellogg's Snacks Plant, Kansas City
 Parker School, Kansas City, 1938
 Sumner Academy of Arts & Science, Kansas City, 1937
 Vernon School, Kansas City, 1936
 Washington High School, Kansas City, 1932
 Wyandotte High School, Kansas City, 1936

Olathe 
 New Century AirCenter Administration Building, Olathe, 1942
 New Century AirCenter Air Station Garage, Olathe, 1942
 New Century AirCenter Mechanics Garage, Olathe, 1942
 New Century AirCenter Power Station, Olathe, 1942

Salina 
 107 North Santa Fe Avenue, Salina
 109–111 North Santa Fe Avenue, Salina
 129 North Santa Fe Avenue, Salina
 131 North Santa Fe Avenue, Salina
 135 North Santa Fe Avenue, Salina
 145 North Santa Fe Avenue, Salina
 234 North Santa Fe Avenue, Salina
 243 North Santa Fe Avenue, Salina
 Cork Building (now Extraordinary Events), Salina
 Fox–Watson Theater Building, Salina, 1931
 Municipal Waterworks, Salina, 1934
 United Building, Salina, 1930
 Vogue Theatre (former Limon–Bell Tire Company), Salina, 1928

Topeka 
 305 Southeast 17th, Topeka, 1940
 1802 Northwest Topeka Boulevard, Topeka, 1939
 Agriculture Hall, Kansas State Fairgrounds, Topeka
 American Legion Post 400, Topeka, 1930
 Coca-Cola Bottling Company, Topeka, 1940
 East Topeka Junior High School, Topeka, 1935
 Iron Rail Brewing (former W.T. Grant Building), Topeka, 1935
 Kansas Department of Transportation District 1 Building, Topeka, 1935
 Kaw Valley State Bank, Topeka, 1935
 Santa Fe Hospital, Topeka, 1930
 Sumner Elementary School, Topeka, 1936
 Topeka Performing Arts Center, Topeka, 1939
 Topeka Water Pollution Control Waste Water Treatment Plant, Topeka, 1929

Wichita 
 Adeline Apartment Building, Wichita, 1923
 Allen's Market, Wichita, 1930
 Dunbar Theatre, Wichita, 1941
 Griffin Architectural Office Building, Wichita, 1940
 Helzburg Building, 219 East Douglas, Wichita, 1948
 Hiland Dairy, Wichita, 1945
 John Marshall Middle School, Wichita, 1939
 Johnson Drug Store Building, Wichita, 1930
 Johnson–Cohlmia Building, Wichita, 1930
 Kansas Aviation Museum, Wichita, 1935
 Kellogg Elementary School, Wichita, 1935
 Longfellow Elementary School, Wichita, 1930
 Marquee Motorcars, Wichita, 1930
 Minisa Bridge, Wichita, 1932
 North Riverside Park Comfort Station, Wichita, 1934
 Petroleum Building, Wichita, 1929
 Robinson Middle School, Wichita, 1931
 Sedgwick County EMS County Employee Association, Wichita, 1941
 Steffen Ice and Ice Cream Co. (now Hiland-Steffen Dairy Foods), Wichita, 1931
 United States Post Office and Federal Building, Wichita, 1936
 Walter S. Henrion House, Wichita, 1929
 Wichita North High School, Wichita, 192

Other cities 
 American Legion Hall, Wellington, 1938
 Anthony Municipal Hall, Anthony, 1935
 Anthony Theater, Anthony, 1936
 Augusta Theater, Augusta, 1935
 Beloit Municipal Building, Beloit, 1897, 1917
 Besse Apartments (former Hotel Besse), Pittsburg, 1927
 Burlington Opry (former Plaza Theatre), Burlington, 1925 and 1940
 Clay Center Municipal Band Shell, Clay Center, 1933
 Colby City Hall, Colby, 1936
 Communitea, Overland Park, 1945
 Cottonwood Falls Municipal Building, Cottonwood Falls, 1938
 Crest Theatre, Great Bend, 1950
 Decatur Community High School, Oberlin, 1930s
 Dighton High School, Dighton, 1936
 Dream Theater, Russell, 1929 and 1949
 Earl H. Ellis VFW Post No. 1362, Pratt, 1939
 Eugene Ware Elementary School, Fort Scott, 1935
 First National Bank, Herrington
 Fowler Swimming Pool and Bathhouse, Fowler, 1936
 Grant County Courthouse District, Ulysses, 1929
 Greeley County High School, Tribune, 1941
 Gregg Theatre, 116 South Chautauqua Street, Sedan, 1938
 Hiawatha National Guard Armory, Hiawatha, 1938
 High School Gymnasium, Elk Falls, 1920
 Hollywood Theater, Leavenworth, 1937
 Hoisington High School, Hoisington, 1940
 Hotel Roberts, Pratt, 1930
 Howard T. Sawhill City Park Bandshell, St. Francis, 1934
 Ice Plant, Downtown Wellington Historic District, Wellington, 1935
 Jewell County Courthouse, Mankato, 1937
 Junction City Fire Department (former Municipal Building), Junction City, 1936
 Labette County High School, Altamont, 1940
 Lane County Community High School, Dighton, 1938
 Lincoln Elementary School, Clay Center, 1939
 Lincoln School, District 2, Ellwood, 1935
 Marysville High School and Junior High Complex, Marysville, 1937
 Masonic Hall, Hays, 1947
 McDaniel Education Resource Center, Bonner Springs, 1935
 McKague Memorial Masonic Temple, Oberlin, 1932
 Municipal Building, Edna, 1939
 NLC Elementary (former Americus High School), Americus, 1941
 Nova Theatre, Stockton, 1933
 Norcatur City Hall, Norcatur, 1937
 Overland Theatre (former Rio Theatre), Overland Park, 1925
 Paradise Water Tower, Paradise, 1938
 Power Plant No. 1, McPherson, 1934
 Republic County Courthouse, Belleville, 1939
 Ruleton School, Ruleton, 1928
 St. Benedict's Abbey, Atchinson, 1957
 St. Francis Community High School, St. Francis
 Scott City High School, Scott City, 1930
 Telephone Building, Goodland, 1931
 Thomas County Insurance (former Telephone Building), Colby
 United States. Post Office (former high school), Englewood, 1940
 United States Post Office, Sabetha, 1937
 United Telephone Building, Goodland, 1931
 Wabaunsee County Courthouse, Alma, 1932
 Wakefield High School, Wakefield, 1949
 Warshaw Building, Dodge City, 1915 and 1930
 Washington City Hall, Washington, 1934
 Washington County Courthouse, Washington, 1934

See also 
 List of Art Deco architecture
 List of Art Deco architecture in the United States

References 

 "Art Deco & Streamline Moderne Buildings." Roadside Architecture.com. Retrieved 2019-01-03.
 Cinema Treasures. Retrieved 2022-09-06
 "Court House Lover". Flickr. Retrieved 2022-09-06
 "New Deal Map". The Living New Deal. Retrieved 2020-12-25.
 "SAH Archipedia". Society of Architectural Historians. Retrieved 2021-11-21.

External links
 

 
Art Deco
Art Deco architecture in the United States
Iowa-related lists